Sir Robert Barclay, 8th Baronet (13 September 1755 – 14 August 1839) was Whig MP for Newtown (Isle of Wight) 1802–1806 and 1806–1807.

1755 births
1839 deaths
Members of Parliament for the Isle of Wight
UK MPs 1802–1806
UK MPs 1806–1807
Baronets in the Baronetage of Nova Scotia